Glenn Michael Wilson (born 16 March 1986) is an English professional footballer who plays as a defender for Hornchurch.

Career
Born in Lewisham, Greater London, Wilson came through the youth setup of Crystal Palace where he had been since the age of nine. However, despite being reserve team captain he found first team opportunities limited at Selhurst Park and was sent on a month-long loan to Isthmian League First Division side AFC Wimbledon. Wilson signed for Conference National club Rushden & Diamonds in July 2006, where he found himself a first team regular under manager Paul Hart. However, Hart was sacked later on in the season, and Wilson fell out of favour at the club when Graham Westley was appointed. In March 2007, he was sent out on loan to fellow Conference side Kidderminster Harriers for the rest of the season. In the summer of 2007 Wilson joined Crawley Town on a free transfer. In May 2012, Wilson was released by the club after being deemed surplus to requirements.

On 28 June 2012, Wilson signed for Gateshead on a one-year deal. He made his debut as a substitute on 14 August 2012 in a 4–1 win over Mansfield Town. He made his first start for Gateshead on 22 September 2012 in a 1–2 defeat at Woking.

On 30 January 2013, Wilson joined Salisbury City on loan for the rest of the season. He made his debut for Salisbury on 9 February in a 1–2 defeat against Dorchester Town.

On 25 April 2013, Wilson was one of seven players released by Gateshead.

He returned to Salisbury City in the pre-season period, and made an appearance for them against Bournemouth. Two days later, he signed for Salisbury ahead of the upcoming season. As a result of Salisbury captain Brian Dutton developing injury problems, Wilson took on the role of captain and started the season well, playing as a central defender instead of his usual full-back position.

Wilson signed for Conference Premier side Aldershot Town on 26 June 2014.

In January 2019, Wilson signed with Hornchurch on dual registration.

Career statistics

References

External links

1986 births
Living people
Footballers from Lewisham
English footballers
Association football midfielders
Crystal Palace F.C. players
AFC Wimbledon players
Rushden & Diamonds F.C. players
Kidderminster Harriers F.C. players
Crawley Town F.C. players
Fleetwood Town F.C. players
Woking F.C. players
Gateshead F.C. players
Salisbury City F.C. players
Aldershot Town F.C. players
Margate F.C. players
Greenwich Borough F.C. players
Grays Athletic F.C. players
Wealdstone F.C. players
Hornchurch F.C. players
English Football League players
National League (English football) players
Isthmian League players